Monte Zappi (also called Monte Gennaro or Pizzo di Monte Gennaro) is a peak in the Monti Lucretili, in  Lazio, central Italy. It is located in the province of Rome, in the communal territories of Palombara Sabina and San Polo dei Cavalieri.

History

It is likely identifiable with the Lucretili Mons mentioned by Horace as visible from his Sabine farm, and probably identical with the Mons Lucretius mentioned in the Liber Pontificalis, which speaks of possessio in territorio Sabinensi quae cognominatur ad duas casas sub monte Lucretio in the time of Constantine. Excavations on the supposed site of Horace's farm were begun in September 1909.

References

Zappi